Eduardo Haas Gehlen (born 19 April 1994), commonly known as Duda, is a Brazilian footballer who plays as a right back for Almagro CF.

Career
Duda signed with Bulgarian club Dunav Ruse on 7 August 2018 on a two-year deal.

Honours

Club
Juventude
 Semifinalist 2016

References

External links
 

1994 births
Living people
Brazilian footballers
Association football defenders
CR Vasco da Gama players
Grêmio Foot-Ball Porto Alegrense players
Coritiba Foot Ball Club players
Esporte Clube Juventude players
Esporte Clube Internacional de Lages players
Associação Portuguesa de Desportos players
Maringá Futebol Clube players
Grêmio Esportivo Anápolis players
Operário Futebol Clube (MS) players
FC Dunav Ruse players
AC Kajaani players
Esporte Clube São Luiz players
Campeonato Brasileiro Série C players
Campeonato Brasileiro Série B players
First Professional Football League (Bulgaria) players
Ykkönen players
Tercera División players
Brazilian expatriate footballers
Brazilian expatriate sportspeople in Bulgaria
Brazilian expatriate sportspeople in Finland
Brazilian expatriate sportspeople in Spain
Expatriate footballers in Bulgaria
Expatriate footballers in Finland
Expatriate footballers in Spain
Oulun Työväen Palloilijat players